Vivian Tainui "Viv" Haar (born 27 August 1952) is a rower from New Zealand.

Haar was born in 1952 in Taumarunui, New Zealand. He was a member of the Petone Rowing Club.

He represented New Zealand in the coxed fours at the 1976 Summer Olympics at Montreal, and they came in sixth place. He is listed as New Zealand Olympian athlete number 349 by the New Zealand Olympic Committee.

See also 
Rowing at the 1976 Summer Olympics

References 

 Black Gold by Ron Palenski (2008, 2004 New Zealand Sports Hall of Fame, Dunedin) p. 44

External links
 

Living people
1952 births
New Zealand male rowers
Rowers at the 1976 Summer Olympics
Olympic rowers of New Zealand
20th-century New Zealand people